The PS Anthony Wayne (also known as Anthony B. Wayne or General Wayne) was an early wooden-hulled sidewheel steamship that sank on April 28, 1850, in Lake Erie off the coast of Vermilion, Ohio, after two of her starboard side boilers exploded. The number of people on board the ship at the time of incident is estimated to be about 100. The ship's clerk reported that there were 80 to 100 people on board, which included the crew, with about 30 of them surviving.

Although she was discovered in 2006, a public announcement was not made until June 21, 2007. On January 2, 2018, the wreck of the Wayne was listed on the National Register of Historic Places.

History
The Anthony Wayne was built in 1837, in Perrysburg, Ohio, by Samuel L. Hubbell. She had a gross tonnage of 390.50 tons. She was powered by a 120-horsepower high pressure steam engine with a  piston, power for the engine was provided by 4 Scotch marine boilers, and she was propelled two  paddle wheels. The engine was built by Hathaway & Company in 1936. She was named after United States Army officer Anthony Wayne. 

On May 24, 1843, she caught fire at a wharf in Sandusky, Ohio. On May 23, 1848, she lost her upper deck because of hurricane-force winds at Detroit, Michigan. In 1849, the Wayne was extensively rebuilt in Trenton, Michigan, by D.W. Donahue. She was given a new engine from the steamer Columbus, which had wrecked on a sand bar at Dunkirk, New York, and her old engine was fitted to the steamer Baltimore. Her new engine was a 150-horsepower horizontal crosshead engine built by Olds & Company of Sandusky, Ohio, and was rebuilt by James Menzes. She also received new boilers. On January 12, 1850, the Wayne was crushed by ice and sank at the John Chester & Company dock in the Detroit River.

Final voyage
On April 27, 1850, the Wayne left Toledo, Ohio carrying about 25 passengers; she later steamed into Sandusky, Ohio. She left Sandusky, bound for Buffalo, New York, at midnight with 300 barrels of high-quality wine, whiskey, some cattles and horses, and about 40 additional passengers on board. At the time of the disaster, Captain E. C. Gore was blown out of his bed and was unhurt; he survived in a lifeboat with the ship's clerk, a fireman and two passengers. The lifeboat eventually drifted ashore at Vermilion, Ohio.

References

Notes

1837 ships
Great Lakes ships
Shipwrecks of Lake Erie
Merchant ships of the United States
Steamships of the United States
Ships built in Ohio
Maritime incidents in April 1850
 
Shipwrecks of the Ohio coast
Wreck diving sites in the United States